Ana Carolina da Silva (born 8 April 1991) is a Brazilian indoor volleyball player. She is a current member of the Brazil women's national volleyball team.

Career
Da Silva won the silver medal and the Best Middle Blocker award at the 2013 Club World Championship playing with Unilever Vôlei.
Da Silva played with her national team, winning the bronze at the 2014 World Championship when her team defeated Italy 3–2 in the bronze medal match.

During the 2015 FIVB Club World Championship, da Silva played with the Brazilian club Rexona Ades Rio and her team lost the bronze medal match to the Swiss Voléro Zürich, Nonetheless, she won the tournament's Best Blocker award along with the Croatian Maja Poljak. She averaged 1.07 stuff blocks per set, just behind Poljak who blocked 1.19.

She won the 2017 South American Championship Best Middle Blocker award. and later the 2017 FIVB World Grand Champions Cup Best Middle Blocker award.

Awards

Individuals
 2013 FIVB Club World Championship – "Best Middle Blocker"
2013 FIVB Club World Championship – "Best Blocker"
 2015 FIVB Club World Championship – "Best Middle Blocker"
 2014–15 Brazilian Superliga – "Best Blocker"
 2015–16 Brazilian Superliga – "Best Blocker"
 2015–16 Brazilian Superliga – "Best Server"
2018–19 Brazilian Superliga – "Best Blocker"
2018–19 Brazilian Superliga – "Best Middle Blocker"
2020–21 Brazilian Superliga – "Best Middle Blocker"
2017–18 Turkish Women's Volleyball League – "Best Middle Blocker"
2017–18 Turkish Women's Volleyball League – "Best Blocker"
 2015 South American Club Championship – "Best Middle Blocker"
 2016 South American Club Championship – "Best Middle Blocker"
 2016 South American Club Championship – "Most Valuable Player"
2020 South American Club Championship  – "Best Middle Blocker"
2022 South American Club Championship  – "Best Middle Blocker"
2014 Montreux Volley Masters – "Best Blocker"
 2017 Montreux Volley Masters – "Best Middle Blocker"
 2017 Montreux Volley Masters – "Most Valuable Player"
 2017 South American Championship – "Best Middle Blocker"
 2021 South American Championship – "Best Middle Blocker"
 2017 FIVB World Grand Champions Cup – "Best Middle Blocker"
2017 FIVB World Grand Champions Cup – "Best Blocker"
2022 FIVB Nations League – "Best Middle Blocker"
2022 World Championship – "Best Middle Blocker"

Clubs
 2011–12 Brazilian Superliga –  Runner-Up, with Unilever Vôlei
 2013–14 Brazilian Superliga –  Champion, with Unilever Vôlei
 2014–15 Brazilian Superliga –  Champion, with Rexona-Ades
 2015–16 Brazilian Superliga –  Champion, with Rexona-Ades
 2016–17 Brazilian Superliga –  Champion, with Rexona-Sesc
 2018–19 Brazilian Superliga –  Runner-Up, with Dentil/Praia Clube
 2020–21 Brazilian Superliga –  Runner-Up, with Dentil/Praia Clube
 2021–22 Brazilian Superliga –  Runner-Up, with Dentil/Praia Clube
 2013 FIVB Club World Championship –  Runner-Up, with Unilever Vôlei
 2015 South American Club Championship –  Champion, with Rexona-Ades
 2016 South American Club Championship –  Champion, with Rexona-Ades
 2017 South American Club Championship –  Champion, with Rexona-Sesc
 2019 South American Club Championship –  Runner-Up, with Dentil/Praia Clube
 2020 South American Club Championship –  Runner-Up, with Dentil/Praia Clube
 2021 South American Club Championship –  Champion, with Dentil/Praia Clube
 2020 South American Club Championship –  Runner-Up, with Dentil/Praia Clube

References

1991 births
Brazilian women's volleyball players
Living people
Universiade medalists in volleyball
Middle blockers
Expatriate volleyball players in Turkey
Brazilian expatriate sportspeople in Turkey
Universiade gold medalists for Brazil
Medalists at the 2011 Summer Universiade
Volleyball players at the 2020 Summer Olympics
Olympic volleyball players of Brazil
Medalists at the 2020 Summer Olympics
Olympic medalists in volleyball
Olympic silver medalists for Brazil
Sportspeople from Belo Horizonte
LGBT volleyball players